John Seaton Waddingham (born 24 August 1934) is a New Zealand former cricketer. He played five first-class matches for Auckland between 1953 and 1960.

See also
 List of Auckland representative cricketers

References

External links
 

1934 births
Living people
New Zealand cricketers
Auckland cricketers
Cricketers from Auckland